The Ballad of Dood and Juanita is the seventh studio album by American country music singer-songwriter Sturgill Simpson, released on August 20, 2021. Simpson describes the album as "traditional country, bluegrass and mountain music, including gospel and a cappella." Willie Nelson guests on the song "Juanita". Simpson wrote and recorded the album in a week, and it has been described as a concept album "about love among the legends of the Kentucky frontier".

Track listing

Charts

References

2021 albums
Concept albums
Sturgill Simpson albums